Protein argonaute-1 is a protein that in humans is encoded by the EIF2C1 gene.

Function 

This gene encodes a member of the Argonaute family of proteins which play a role in RNA interference. The encoded protein is highly basic, and contains a PAZ domain and a PIWI domain. It may interact with dicer1 and play a role in short-interfering-RNA-mediated gene silencing. This gene is located on chromosome 1 in a cluster of closely related family members including argonaute 3, and argonaute 4.

Model organisms 	
		

Model organisms have been used in the study of EIF2C1 function. A conditional knockout mouse line, called Eif2c1tm1a(KOMP)Wtsi was generated as part of the International Knockout Mouse Consortium program — a high-throughput mutagenesis project to generate and distribute animal models of disease to interested scientists.

Male and female animals underwent a standardized phenotypic screen to determine the effects of deletion. Twenty two tests were carried out on mutant mice and two significant abnormalities were observed: homozygous mutants were subviable and females also had decreased circulating aspartate transaminase levels.

References

Further reading 

 
 
 
 
 
 
 
 
 
 
 
 

Genes mutated in mice